Washington Square is a novel written in 1880 by Henry James about a father's attempts to thwart a romance between his naive daughter and the man he believes wishes to marry her for her money. The novel was famously adapted into a play, The Heiress, which in turn became an Academy Award-winning film starring Olivia de Havilland in the title role.

Background
The plot of the novel is based upon a story told to James by his close friend, British actress Fanny Kemble. An 1879 entry in James' notebooks details an incident where Kemble told James about her brother, who romantically pursued "a dull, commonplace girl...who had a very handsome private fortune."

Plot
In 1840s New York City, naive, introverted Catherine Sloper lives with her tyrannical father, Dr. Austin Sloper, in Washington Square, a fashionable neighborhood near Greenwich Village. Embittered by the deaths of his wife and son, Dr. Sloper makes Catherine a constant target for verbal and mental abuse. Catherine finds solace in her idealistic aunt, Lavinia Penniman, who came to live with Dr. Sloper when her own husband died. Aunt Penniman puts herself in charge of Catherine's education.

Catherine's cousin Marian gets engaged to a man named Arthur Townsend. At the engagement party, Marian introduces Catherine to Arthur's cousin Morris, who flirts with her throughout the party. Catherine becomes infatuated with Morris and the two begin a romance. Dr. Sloper vehemently opposes the relationship, pointing out that Catherine cannot reasonably expect a man as desirable as Townsend to find her attractive in her own right. Sloper discovers Townsend had squandered his prior inheritance and now lives with his widowed sister. This convinces him that Townsend only wishes to marry Catherine for her money. At dinner, Sloper informs Townsend he abhors him and will not allow the marriage. Townsend insists he will marry Catherine anyway and, with the encouragement of Aunt Penniman, the two plan to elope.

Sloper takes his daughter to Europe for a year, hoping she will forget Townsend, while Aunt Penniman invites Townsend to live in the Sloper home in their absence. While they are in Switzerland, Sloper attempts once more to talk Catherine out of her engagement, but she stands her ground, surprising Sloper with her tenacity. Once the Slopers arrive back in New York, Townsend breaks off his engagement to Catherine with no explanation.

Thoroughly disappointed, Catherine refuses to consider any other romantic prospects. She spends the next several years doing charity work and caring for her aging father. When Dr. Sloper contracts a fatal case of pneumonia, he discloses to Catherine that, as punishment for her relationship with Townsend, he has severely reduced her inheritance.

Aunt Penniman orchestrates one last meeting between Townsend and Catherine. Now older and wiser, she rebuffs his advances and resigns herself to life as a spinster.

List of characters
Austin Sloper - Prestigious American physician.
Catherine Sloper - Austin's wife, née Catherine Harrington.
Catherine Sloper, Ms - Austin and Catherine's daughter.
Lavinia Penniman - Austin's sister.
Elizabeth Almond - Austin's sister.
Jefferson Almond - Elizabeth's husband, a prosperous merchant.
Marian Almond - Jefferson and Elizabeth's daughter.
Morris Townsend - Ms. Catherine fiancé, abhorred by Austin.
Arthur Townsend - Morris' cousin,  Marian's fiancée.
Mrs. Montgomery - Morris' widow sister.

Literary significance and criticism
James himself did not think highly of the novel. He described it as "poorish" and said, "The only good thing in the story is the girl." Edward Wagenknecht noted that it "has certainly attracted more favorable attention." Critic Donald Hall wrote, "Everybody likes Washington Square, even the denigrators of Henry James".

Adaptations
Ruth and Augustus Goetz adapted the novel for the stage as The Heiress, originally performed on Broadway in 1947 with Wendy Hiller as Catherine and Basil Rathbone as Dr. Sloper, and revived a number of times since. The play was adapted for film in 1949, and starred Olivia de Havilland as Catherine, Sir Ralph Richardson as Dr. Sloper, and Montgomery Clift as Morris. William Wyler directed. It was nominated for eight Academy Awards and won four.

In 1972, Mexican director Jose Luis Ibañez made a movie version of this novel titled Victoria (based on his own adaptation with Jorge Font) and starred Julissa, Enrique Alvarez Félix, Guillermo Murray and Rita Macedo. This adaptation takes place in modern day Mexico City and takes liberties with the original text.

Rudolf Nureyev choreographed a full length ballet based on the novel and set to the music of Charles Ives for the Paris Opera Ballet in 1985. The time period was updated to the early 1900s.

In 1992, Filipino director Carlos Siguion-Reyna directed a film adaptation titled Ikaw Pa Lang ang Minahal (Only You). It starred Maricel Soriano as Adela (Catherine), Richard Gomez as David Javier (Morris Townsend), Eddie Gutierrez as Dr. Sevilla (Dr. Sloper) and Charito Solis as Tia Paula (Aunt Lavinia). The screenplay was written by Raquel Villavicencio.  
 
Polish director Agnieszka Holland made Washington Square in 1997, starring Jennifer Jason Leigh, Albert Finney, and Ben Chaplin, with Maggie Smith as Mrs. Penniman.

The novel was adapted as an opera by Thomas Pasatieri in 1976.

In 2013, playwright John W. Lowell published a modern gay adaptation called Sheridan Square.

American author Hanya Yanagihara's 2022 novel To Paradise was heavily influenced by Washington Square with the first section taking its title from the novel and loosely following the same setup though re-imagined in an 1890s New York where same-sex marriage is legal.

References

External links

 Original magazine text of Washington Square (1880)
 Macmillan book text of Washington Square (1881)
 Note on the various texts of Washington Square at the Library of America web site
 

1880 American novels
American novels adapted into films
Novels by Henry James
Works originally published in The Cornhill Magazine
Novels first published in serial form
Harper & Brothers books
Novels set in the 1840s
Novels set in New York City
American novels adapted into plays
Novels adapted into operas
Bildungsromans